Elizabeth Tan Su Mei is a Malaysian singer, model and actress of Chinese descent. Elizabeth began her music career in 2014 by producing her solo album, "Knock Knock", "Setia" featuring Faizal Tahir (2015), and "Tabah" (2016). Besides that, she began her acting career through the film "Usop Wilcha Meghonjang Makhluk Muzium" (2015), directed by Shy8. Her talent in the musical field was recognized as she was nominated for "Best New Artist" in the "Anugerah Planet Muzik" awards ceremony in 2015.

Career
Elizabeth Tan, also known as Lizzy, began her music career by uploading videos on YouTube, sometimes only playing with a ukulele. Some of the cover songs that she played were "Pencuri" by Mark Adam, "Kantoi" by Zee Avi, "Maafkan Aku", and some other songs by Yuna, such as "Terukir Di Bintang", "Deeper Conversation" among several others.

She then received more attention from the public through the song “Havoc” which was originally sung by Joe Flizzow at the end of 2014. After the video was uploaded, she was contacted by several recording companies to be their recording artists.

Paranormal Talents 
Elizabeth later became the artist of Faithful Music, which was owned by Faizal Tahir, which was under the management of Paranormal Talents. Elizabeth gained more Malay fans due to her fluent Malay and singing Malay songs. She has also appeared in one of the first official video clips, “Royals” by Lorde, whom Elizabeth was seen to duet with at No Noice Percussion. She came up with her solo album “Knock Knock” which was produced by Faizal and Mike Chan. The song is about a girl who warns people who are trying to approach and not hurt her heart and betray her feelings.

She also appeared in TV stations in Indonesia for several television programmes, such as “Sarah Sechan”, “Ini Talkshow” and “Music Everywhere”. Elizabeth had also sung “Selamat Hari Raya”, and the video was played throughout Ramadan. Elizabeth had made her first film appearance by teaming up with Usop Wilcha, through the comedy film “Usop Wilcha Meghonjang Makhluk Muzium”, directed by Mamat Khalid, where she acted as Tyra Vlad.

In January 2016, Elizabeth released “Are You Leaving Now” as her first English single. This song was written by Audi Mok, meanwhile, the lyrics were written by Elizabeth herself.

Going independent 
She left Paranormal Talents on 15 March 2017 to manage her own career without the assistance of her personal assistance, while her contract with Faithful Music ended the same day.

Elizabeth was one among the 11 local and Indonesian singers who had re-recorded the song “Kau Ilhamku”. The singers involved were Man Bai, Joe Flizow, Siti Nurhaliza, as well as Indonesian singers, such as Afgan Syah Reza and Cita Citata. The song was promoted as an advertising jingle for a collaboration between a streaming service provider Yonder Music, and the telecommunication company Celcom Axiata.

In September 2016, Elizabeth, along with Faizal Tahir and Jaclyn Victor were involved in the #bersatuTENAGA campaign organized by Tenaga Nasional Berhad, where they sang the song “Terangi Hidupku”, in conjunction with the 53rd anniversary of the establishment of Malaysia on 16 September 2016.

Her new single, “SHH” was released in December 2016. Elizabeth released two of her singles in 2018 “Police Entry” which was released in July, followed by “Semua Sudah” in December.

On 31 July 2017, Elizabeth played the role of Maya Adrianna in a romcom drama series “My Darling, Inspektor Daniel”, published by Skop Productions, and directed by Aziz M. Osman. It was played through Mega Drama slot on Astro Ria, replacing the drama “Mencintaimu Mr. Photographer”. She collaborated with Aaron Aziz, Siti Elizad, Dazrin Kamarudin, and Erra Fazira.

She played the role of Suzy, a college student who practices a free lifestyle in Gerak Khas in the episode of “Jerat Kekasih”. Elizabeth became the main character alongside Zul Ariffin in the film directed by Syafiq Yusof, “Misteri Dilaila”, which aired on 21 February 2019. The film was filmed at Fraser’s Hills, Pahang, which also starred Rosyam Nor, Namron and Sasqia Dahuri. Besides that, she has also contributed her voice for the soundtrack of the film “Hidup Semula”. Elizabeth acted with Syafiq Kyle in the drama “Senafas Rindu” where she played two roles, as Vivianna/Siti Nur Ain.

Discography

Single

Filmography

Film

Television series

Telemovie

Television

Music videos

Endorsements

References

External links
 
 
 
 
 

Living people
Malaysian people of Chinese descent
People from Kuala Lumpur
21st-century Malaysian women singers
Malaysian actresses
Year of birth missing (living people)